Asensio is a Spanish given name and surname. 

Notable people with the given name include:

 Asensio Julià i Alvarracín (1760–1832), Spanish painter and engraver 
 Asensio Nebot "The Friar" (1779 – after 1831), Spanish monk and rebel

Notable people with the surname include:

 Ana Asensio (born 1978), Spanish actress and filmmaker
 Belén Asensio (born 1976), Spanish female taekwondo practitioner
 Carlos Asensio Cabanillas (1896–1969), Spanish soldier and statesman
 Eloy Guerrero Asensio (born 1962), track and field athlete from Spain
 Enrique García Asensio (born 1937), Spanish conductor 
 Eugeni Asensio (born 1937), Spanish water polo sports official
 Florentino Asensio Barroso (1877–1936), Spanish Catholic bishop and martyr
 Jaime Asensio de la Fuente, commonly known as Asen (born 1978), a Spanish footballer
 José Asensio Torrado (1892–1961), Spanish general
 José María Asensio (1829–1905), Spanish historian, journalist, biographer and writer
 Manola Asensio (born 1943), Swiss ballet dancer
 Manuel P. Asensio (born 1954), American money manager
 Marco Asensio (born 1996), Spanish footballer
 Melanio Asensio (1936–2021), Spanish athlete
 Nicole Laurel Asensio (born 1986), Filipino singer-songwriter
 Pablo Asensio (born 1973), Spanish footballer
 Pedro Calvo Asensio (1821–1863), Spanish playwright, journalist and politician

See also
 Asensi
 San Asensio, municipality and town in the La Rioja autonomous community, northern Spain

Spanish-language surnames